Dan Osman is an American politician and attorney who serves as a member of the Kansas House of Representatives representing the 48th district in Johnson County, Kansas. He was elected by Democratic Party committee members in the 48th district on July 7, 2021 to complete the term of former Rep. Jennifer Day who resigned in June 2021. Representative Osman was selected to fill the remainder of Representative Day's term which expires in January 2023.

Representative Osman is an attorney and graduate of the University of Kansas School of Law. Representative Osman previously served on the Hickman Mills Board of Education in Kansas City, Missouri, including as vice president of the board. He was previously a prosecutor in Jackson County, Missouri. Representative Osman unsuccessfully sought a seat on the Overland Park City Council in 2019.

2021-2022 Kansas House of Representatives Committee Assignments
Committee Assignments TBD

References

Living people
Democratic Party members of the Kansas House of Representatives
21st-century American politicians
Politicians from Overland Park, Kansas
Year of birth missing (living people)
School board members in Missouri
University of Kansas School of Law alumni
American prosecutors
21st-century American lawyers